Otierre (a.k.a. OTR) are an Italian hip hop band.
The name means Originale Trasmissione del Ritmo (Original Rhythm Transmission).

OTR was formed in 1991 in Varese, and the final formation was:,

 Esa (a.k.a. El Presidente, real name Francesco Cellamaro, born in Reggio Calabria on 1973 and living in Varese) 
 Polare (a.k.a. Polaroide, real name Daniele Macchi, from Varese) 
 Torrido (a.k.a. Thor) 
 Azza 
 Intruso 
 Limite
and the DJs:
 Fede 
 Irmu 
 Vigor 
 Vez 
 Nitro

Discography

Quel Sapore Particolare (1994)
 Entro 
 Quando meno te l'aspetti 
 Slaugio 
 Il punto della situazione 
 Arresta 
 Pronto pine 
 Lo sciupa 
 Chi va la'
 Dei colori
 Il passo e' veloce
 Esco 
 La nuova realta'

Dalla Sede (1997)
 La 'O' la 'T' la 'R' feat. La Pina
 Ce n'e'feat. La Pina
 Rispettane l'aroma feat. La Pina
 Extrapolare 
 Finallafinefininfondo feat. La Pina
 Anothasounwatess
 Chiedo permesso
 Pura algebra feat. La Pina
 Secondo me 
 Ha-ha!! feat. Toni-L
 Soci per la vita 
 Play your position feat. La Pina, Rival Capone
 Rispettane l'aroma (Radio Edit)

References

Italian musical groups